Lee Dong-wook (born November 6, 1981) is a South Korean actor and model.

Film

Television series

Theatre

Hosting and Variety show

Radio

Music video appearances

References

South Korean filmographies